Manroot is a common name for several plants with very large roots including:

Ipomoea leptophylla, a species of morning glory
Ipomoea pandurata, a species of morning glory
Marah, a genus of gourds native to western North America